Eilleen Regina "Shania" Twain  (born August 28, 1965) is a Canadian singer-songwriter and actress. She has sold over 100 million records, making her the best-selling female artist in country music history and one of the best-selling music artists of all time. Her success garnered her several titles including the "Queen of Country Pop". Billboard named her as the leader of the '90s country-pop crossover stars.

Raised in Timmins, Ontario, Twain pursued singing and songwriting from a young age before signing with Mercury Nashville Records in the early 1990s. Her self-titled debut studio album was a commercial failure upon release in 1993. After collaborating with producer and later husband Robert John "Mutt" Lange, Twain rose to fame with her second studio album, The Woman in Me (1995), which brought her widespread success. It sold over 20 million copies worldwide, spawned eight singles, including "Any Man of Mine" and earned her a Grammy Award. Her third studio album, Come On Over (1997), became the best-selling studio album by a female act in any genre and the best-selling country album of all time, selling over 40 million copies worldwide. Come On Over produced twelve singles, including "You're Still the One", "From This Moment On", "That Don't Impress Me Much" and "Man! I Feel Like a Woman!" and earned Twain four Grammy Awards. Her fourth studio album, Up! (2002), spawned eight singles, including "I'm Gonna Getcha Good!", "Ka-Ching!" and "Forever and for Always", selling over 20 million copies worldwide, also being certified Diamond in the United States.

In 2004, after releasing her Greatest Hits album, which produced three new singles including "Party for Two", Twain entered a hiatus, revealing years later that diagnoses with Lyme disease and dysphonia led to a severely weakened singing voice. She chronicled her vocal rehabilitation on the OWN miniseries Why Not? with Shania Twain, released her first single in six years in 2011, "Today Is Your Day", and published an autobiography, From This Moment On. Twain returned to performing the following year with an exclusive concert residency at The Colosseum at Caesars Palace, Shania: Still the One, which ran until 2014. In 2015, she launched the North American Rock This Country Tour, which was billed as her farewell tour. Twain released her first studio album in 15 years in 2017, Now, and embarked on the Now Tour in 2018. In 2019, she started her second Las Vegas residency, Let's Go! at the Zappos Theater. Her sixth studio album Queen of Me was released in 2023. 

Twain has received five Grammy Awards, two World Music Awards, 39 BMI Songwriter Awards, stars on Canada's Walk of Fame and the Hollywood Walk of Fame, and inductions into the Canadian Music Hall of Fame and Nashville Songwriters Hall of Fame. According to the RIAA she is the only female artist in history to have three (consecutive) albums certified Diamond by the RIAA and is the sixth best-selling female artist in the United States. Altogether, Twain is ranked as the 10th best-selling artist of the Nielsen SoundScan era. Billboard listed Twain as the 13th Greatest Music Video Female Solo Artist of all time (42nd overall).

Early life
Twain was born Eilleen Regina Edwards in Windsor, Ontario, on August 28, 1965, to Sharon (née Morrison) and Clarence Edwards. She has two sisters, Jill and Carrie Ann. Her parents divorced when she was two and her mother moved to Timmins, Ontario, with her daughters. Sharon married Jerry Twain, an Ojibwa from the nearby Mattagami First Nation, and they had a son, Mark, together. Jerry adopted the girls and legally changed their surname to Twain. When Mark was a toddler, Jerry and Sharon adopted Jerry's baby nephew Darryl when his mother died. Because of Twain's connection to Jerry, the media have incorrectly reported that she is of Ojibwe descent. When questioned as to why she chose not to publicly acknowledge Edwards as her father for years, Twain stated: My father (Jerry) went out of his way to raise three daughters that weren't even his. For me to acknowledge another man as my father, a man who was never there for me as a father, who wasn't the one who struggled every day to put food on our table, would have hurt him terribly. We were a family. Step-father, step-brothers, we never used that vocabulary in our home. To have referred to him as my step-father would have been the worst slap across the face to him.Twain currently holds a status card and is on the official band membership list of the Temagami First Nation. In 1991, the singer was offered a recording contract in Nashville and applied for immigration status into the United States. At that time, by virtue of her stepfather Jerry Twain being a full-blooded Ojibwe and the rights guaranteed to Native Americans in the Jay Treaty (1795), Shania became legally registered as having 50 per cent Native American blood.

Twain has said that as a child she was told by her mother that her biological father was part Cree, a claim his family denies. Her confirmed ancestry includes English, French, and Irish. Through a maternal great-grandmother, she is a descendant of French carpenter Zacharie Cloutier. Her Irish maternal grandmother, Eileen Pearce, emigrated from Newbridge, County Kildare.

Twain has said she had a difficult childhood. Her parents earned little money, and food was often scarce in their household. Twain did not confide her situation to school authorities, fearing they might break up the family. Her mother and stepfather's marriage was stormy at times, and from a young age she witnessed violence between them. Her mother also struggled with bouts of depression. Twain eventually convinced her mother to take her and the children and run away to a homeless shelter in Toronto, however Sharon returned to Jerry with the children in 1981. In Timmins, Twain started singing at bars at the age of eight to try to help pay her family's bills; she often earned $20 between midnight and 1 a.m. performing for remaining customers after the bar had finished serving alcohol. Although she expressed a dislike for singing in those bars, Twain believes that this was her own kind of performing-arts school on the road. She has said of the ordeal, "My deepest passion was music and it helped. There were moments when I thought, 'I hate this.' I hated going into bars and being with drunks. But I loved the music and so I survived." She states that the art of creating, of actually writing songs, "was very different from performing them and became progressively important".

At age 13, Twain was invited to perform on the CBC's Tommy Hunter Show. While attending Timmins High and Vocational School, she was also the singer for a local band called Longshot, which covered Top 40 music. In the early 1980s, Twain spent some time working with her father's reforestation business in northern Ontario, which employed some 75 Ojibwe and Cree workers. Although the work was demanding and the pay low, Twain said, "I loved the feeling of being stranded. I'm not afraid of being in my own environment, being physical, working hard. I was very strong, I walked miles and miles every day and carried heavy loads of trees. You can't shampoo, use soap or deodorant, or makeup, nothing with any scent; you have to bathe and rinse your clothes in the lake. It was a very rugged existence, but I was very creative and I would sit alone in the forest with my dog and a guitar and would just write songs."

Career

1983–1992: Beginnings

Twain graduated from Timmins High in June 1983 eager to expand her musical horizons. After Longshot's demise, Twain was approached by a cover band led by Diane Chase called "Flirt" and toured all over Ontario with them. She also took singing lessons from Toronto-based coach Ian Garrett, often cleaning his house as payment. In the autumn of 1984, Twain's talents were noticed by Toronto DJ Stan Campbell who wrote about her in a Country Music News article: "Eilleen possesses a powerful voice with an impressive range. She has the necessary drive, ambition and positive attitude to achieve her goals". Campbell happened to be making an album by Canadian musician (and present-day CKTB radio personality) Tim Denis at the time and Twain was featured on the backing vocals of the song "Heavy on the Sunshine". Country singer Mary Bailey saw Twain perform in Sudbury, Ontario, saying "I saw this little girl up on stage with a guitar and it absolutely blew me away. She performed Willie Nelson's "Blue Eyes Crying in the Rain" and Hank Williams' "I'm So Lonesome I Could Cry". Her voice reminded me of Tanya Tucker, it had strength and character, a lot of feeling. She's a star, she deserves an opportunity." Bailey later said "She sang a few songs that she had written, and I thought to myself, this kid is like nineteen years old, where does she get this? This is from a person who's lived sixty years".

She moved back to Timmins to take care of her younger siblings and took them all to Huntsville, Ontario, where she supported them by earning money performing at the nearby Deerhurst Resort.

1993–1994: Shania Twain
Several years later, when Twain's siblings moved out on their own, she assembled a demo tape of her songs and her Huntsville manager set up a showcase for her to present her material to record executives. She caught the attention of a few labels, including Mercury Nashville Records, who signed her within a few months. During this time, she changed her name to Shania, which was said to be an Ojibwa word which means "on my way." However, Twain's biographer, Robin Eggar, writes: "There is a continuing confusion about what 'Shania' means and if indeed it is an Ojibwe word or phrase at all. There is no mispronounced or misheard phrase in either Ojibwe or Cree that comes close to meaning 'on my way.' Yet the legend of her name continues to be repeated in the media to this day." Eggar was mistaken about there being no Ojibwe phrase that "comes close", as "Ani aya'aa", pronounced "Ah-nih Eye-uh-ah", means "someone on the way" in Ojibwe. It is therefore possible that someone with an imperfect knowledge of the Ojibwe language created Shania with the incorrect idea it would mean "she's on the way".

Twain's self-titled debut album was released on April 20, 1993, in North America and garnered her audiences outside Canada. Shortly before its release, she sang backing vocals for other Mercury artists, including on Jeff Chance's album Walk Softly on the Bridges (1992) and Sammy Kershaw's album Haunted Heart (1993). While Shania Twain only reached No. 67 on the US Country Albums Chart, it gained positive reviews from critics. The album failed to sell significant copies upon release, but Twain's future success generated enough interest for the album to be certified platinum in 1999 by the RIAA, denoting sales of over 1 million copies. The album yielded two minor hit singles in the United States with "What Made You Say That" and "Dance with the One That Brought You". The third and final single, "You Lay a Whole Lot of Love on Me", failed to chart. All three singles had accompanying music videos. The album was more successful in Europe, where Twain won Country Music Television Europe's "Rising Video Star of the Year" award. In her 2011 autobiography From This Moment On, Twain expressed displeasure with her debut studio album, revealing that she had very little creative control and was frustrated with being unable to showcase her songwriting abilities. She did, however, co-write one song, "God Ain't Gonna Getcha for That", for the album.

1995–1996: The Woman in Me and commercial success
When rock producer Robert John "Mutt" Lange heard Twain's original songs and singing from her debut album, he offered to produce and write songs with her. After many telephone conversations, they met at Nashville's Fan Fair in June 1993. Twain and Lange became very close within just weeks, culminating in their wedding on December 28, 1993. Lange and Twain either wrote or co-wrote the songs that would form her second studio album, The Woman in Me.

The Woman in Me was released on February 7, 1995. Of the 12 tracks on the album, 8 were released as singles. The album's first single, "Whose Bed Have Your Boots Been Under?" went to No. 11 on the Billboard Country Chart. This was followed by her first Country Top 10 and No.1 hit single, "Any Man of Mine", which also cracked the Top 40 on the Billboard Hot 100. Twain had further hits from the album, including the title track which peaked at No.14 and three additional No.1 hits: "(If You're Not in It for Love) I'm Outta Here!", "You Win My Love", and "No One Needs to Know", which was selected for the original soundtrack for the 1996 film Twister, a first for Twain. Plus minor country hit "Home Ain't Where His Heart Is (Anymore)" and a re-recorded gospel version of the album track "God Bless the Child" with new lyrics. Meanwhile, in Australia, five of these singles: "The Woman in Me", "I'm Outta Here!", "You Win My Love", "No One Needs to Know" and "God Bless the Child", were remixed for the Australian pop market, with "I'm Outta Here!" becoming Twain's breakthrough hit there, reaching No.5 on the ARIA charts.

As of 2007, the album had sold more than 12 million copies in the United States, being certified Diamond by the RIAA. The album was a quick breakthrough and because of this Twain performed selected international venues and television shows including two CMA Fan Fair performances with Nashville guitarists Randy Thomas (co-writer of the song "Butterfly Kisses"), Dan Schafer, Chris Rodriguez, Russ Taff, Bon Jovi's bass player Hugh McDonald, Dave Malachowski and Stanley T., formerly with The Beach Boys.

Mercury Nashville's promotion of the album was based largely upon a series of music videos, which every single from the album had. During this period, Twain made television appearances on shows such as two performances on the Late Show with David Letterman, Blockbuster Music Awards, Billboard Music Awards and the American Music Awards. The Woman in Me won the Grammy Award for Best Country Album as well as the Academy of Country Music award for Album of the Year; the latter group also awarded Twain as Best New Female Vocalist.

1997–2001: Come On Over, international breakthrough, and Limelight Sessions

In 1997, Twain released her follow-up album, Come On Over. It established her as a successful crossover singer. Of the 16 tracks on the album, 12 were released as singles. Following the release of lead singles "Love Gets Me Every Time" and "Don't Be Stupid (You Know I Love You)", which allowed Twain to make more appearances in the Billboard Hot 100, the album started selling. With the release of third single, "You're Still the One", sales skyrocketed. "From This Moment On", "When", "Honey, I'm Home", "That Don't Impress Me Much", "Man! I Feel Like a Woman!", "You've Got a Way", the title track, "Rock This Country!", and "I'm Holdin' On to Love (To Save My Life)" are the other nine songs that eventually saw release as singles. With the exception of "I'm Holdin' On to Love", all of the singles had accompanying music videos. "From This Moment On" is a duet with singer Bryan White and there was a re-recorded solo pop version, which was used for its music video.

The album peaked at No. 2 on the Billboard 200 and stayed on the charts for the next two years, going on to sell 40 million copies worldwide, making it the biggest-selling album of all time by a female musician. She continued to break international boundaries for country music and female crossover artists. It is also the ninth highest-selling album by any type of artist in the US and the top selling country album in history. Songs from the album won four Grammy Awards during this time, including Best Country Song and Best Female Country Performance (for "You're Still the One" and "Man! I Feel Like a Woman!") for Twain. Lange won Grammys for "You're Still the One" and "Come On Over".

In 1998, following the pop release of "You're Still the One", the Come On Over album was released in a remixed format for the European market as a pop album with less country instrumentation, and actually gave her the big breakthrough in Europe she and her producer husband Robert John "Mutt" Lange were looking for. Come On Over went to No. 1 on the UK album charts for 11 weeks. It became the biggest selling album of the year in the UK and a bestseller in other big European markets as well, selling more than one million copies in Germany and nearly 4 million in the UK alone. Although "You're Still The One" and the pop version of "From This Moment On" cracked the Top 10 of the UK charts and "When" had success in the Top 20, the songs that finally drew European attention to the album were the pop remixed singles of "That Don't Impress Me Much", which reached number 3 in the UK and cracked the Top 10 in Germany, and "Man! I Feel Like a Woman!", which peaked at number 3 in both the UK and France. Additionally, "You've Got a Way" was remixed specifically for inclusion on the soundtrack for the film Notting Hill. Subsequently, a reissue of the international version of the album was released worldwide, including the US and Europe, containing three of these new remixes. Additionally, the album set the record for the longest ever stay in the Top 20 of the Billboard 200, remaining there for 99 weeks. Billboard magazine declared Shania Twain the most played adult contemporary artist on US radio in 1999.

In 1998, Twain launched her first major concert tour, aided by her manager Jon Landau, a veteran of many large-scale tours with Bruce Springsteen. The Come On Over Tour shows were a success, winning the "Country Tour of the Year" in 1998 and 1999 by Pollstar Concert Industry Awards.

In 2000, Twain was initially scheduled to release a Christmas album, but plans to release one were cancelled later in the year.

Following the success of Come On Over, independent label Limelight Records released The Complete Limelight Sessions in October 2001. The album included 16 tracks recorded in the late 1980s before Twain signed her record deal with Mercury.

As of 2012, the album has sold over 20 million copies in the United States, being certified Double Diamond by the RIAA.

2002–2004: Up!
After a change in management – QPrime replaced Landau – and a two-year break, along with the birth of their son, Eja (pronounced "Asia") D'Angelo, Twain and Lange returned to the studio. Up! was released on November 19, 2002. On January 26, 2003, Twain performed in the Super Bowl XXXVII halftime show. About a year later, Twain kicked off the Up! Tour in Hamilton, Ontario, Canada on September 25, 2003. Up! was released with three different discs – country/acoustic (green CD), pop/rock (red CD), and world/dance (blue CD). Up! was given four out of five stars by Rolling Stone magazine, and debuted at No.1 on the Billboard albums chart, selling 874,000 in the first week alone. It remained at the top of the charts for five weeks. Twain's crossover appeal in the country, pop and dance genres, led Up! to reach 1 in Germany, 2 in Australia and the Top Five in the UK and France. In Germany, Up! was certified 4× platinum and stayed in the Top 100 for a year and a half. The international music disc was remixed with Indian-style orchestral and percussion parts recorded in Mumbai, India. The new versions were produced by Simon and Diamond Duggal, brothers from Birmingham, England. They were originally invited to contribute parts to the pop version of "I'm Gonna Getcha Good!" which retained the Indian influence.

Twain's popularity in UK was reflected by numerous appearances on the long-running music show Top of the Pops, performing singles from Come On Over from 1999. In 2002 an entire special show was dedicated to her on sister show TOTP2, in which Twain herself introduced some past performances of her greatest hits and new singles from Up!. In November 2004, she appeared on the annual BBC charity telethon Children in Need. During the show, she performed "Up!", and then took part in an all-star magic act in which she was sawn in half by magician Scott Penrose in an illusion called Clearly Impossible.

Eight of the tracks were released as singles in various markets. The first single from the album, "I'm Gonna Getcha Good!" became a top 10 country hit in the US, after debuting at No. 24 after only five days of airplay; but only made the Top 40 on the pop charts. It was a much bigger hit on the other side of the Atlantic, released in a pop version, the single hit 4 in the UK. In Australia, Germany and France, the song reached the Top 15 in each case. The follow-up single was the title track, which reached the Top 15 in the US country charts but only reached 63 on the pop charts. The second European single, and third single overall, became the mid-tempo song "Ka-Ching!" (which was never released as a single in North America) with lyrics where Twain was criticizing unchecked consumerism. The song eventually became another smash hit in the important European markets, reaching 1 in Germany and Austria and other European countries, the UK Top 10 and the Top 15 in France. "Ka-Ching!" remains one of Twain's most-successful singles internationally.

The fourth single from the album would be the most successful in the US, the romantic ballad "Forever and for Always". It was released in April 2003 and peaked at 4 on the country chart, 1 on the Adult Contemporary chart and 20 on the Billboard Hot 100. Again, success was even bigger on the other side of the Atlantic with "Forever and For Always" again reaching the Top 10 in both, the UK and Germany. The other four singles from the album were "Thank You Baby! (For Makin' Someday Come So Soon)", "She's Not Just a Pretty Face", "When You Kiss Me" and "It Only Hurts When I'm Breathing". All eight singles had accompanying music videos. The title track "Up!", and "When You Kiss Me" saw release in limited edition to European countries, such as Germany, in early 2004. By January 2008, Up! had sold 5.5 million copies in the US and was certified as 11× platinum (Diamond) by the RIAA. This made Twain the only female artist in history to have three consecutive albums certified Diamond by the RIAA.

2004–2010: Greatest Hits and delay of new album
In 2004, she released the Greatest Hits album, with three new tracks. As of 2012, it had sold over 4.15 million copies in the US. The first single, the multi-format duet "Party for Two", made the country top ten with Billy Currington, while the pop version with Sugar Ray lead singer Mark McGrath made top ten in the United Kingdom and Germany. The follow-up singles, "Don't!" and "I Ain't No Quitter" did not fare as well. The former made Top 20 on Adult Contemporary, while the latter did not gain enough airplay to reach the Country Top 40.

In August 2005, she released the single "Shoes" from the Desperate Housewives soundtrack. In late 2006, Twain and Anne Murray recorded a duet version of Murray's hit "You Needed Me" for her 2007 album, Anne Murray Duets: Friends & Legends. This was Twain's final recording with husband Lange as producer; on May 15, 2008, it was announced that Twain and Lange were separating. Their divorce was finalized in 2010.

In June 2009, Twain released a letter to her fans explaining the delays in the release of her next album, noting she had gone through personal pains and was focusing on raising her son Eja. In August 2009, at a conference in Timmins, Ontario, a spokesman for Twain's label said a new record from the singer was still "nowhere in sight".

2011–2015: Return to music, residency, and tour

In May 2011, Twain confirmed in an interview that she would release her first new single in six years, "Today Is Your Day", after the finale of Why Not? with Shania Twain. Twain previewed the song in the first episode of the series. Twain worked with music producers David Foster and Nathan Chapman on the song. She also published her autobiography with Atria Books, From This Moment On. The last episode of "Why Not?" features Twain and Lionel Richie recording "Endless Love" which would be the first single from his 2012 album, Tuskegee. "Today Is Your Day" was officially released to iTunes and country radio on June 12, 2011. In addition to "Today Is Your Day", Twain also collaborated with Michael Bublé on his 2011 album Christmas (also produced by David Foster). Twain recorded "White Christmas" with Bublé, which was the first single from the album. On June 8, 2011, at a press conference at the Country Music Hall of Fame in Nashville, Twain announced that she would headline Caesars Palace in Las Vegas for two years. Her show, titled Still the One, began on December 1, 2012, with shows expected to run in 2013 and 2014.

In July 2013, Twain announced on Facebook that she was working on her album over the summer during a break from Still the One. In October 2013, Twain sat down with Robin Roberts from Good Morning America as a featured artist on the Countdown to the CMA Awards. In the interview, Twain said that a new album was coming, but she said that she was still in the process of finding the right producer.

Outside of her show at Caesars Palace, Twain performed two concerts at the Calgary Stampede in Calgary, Alberta, on July 9 and 10, 2014. In a series of interviews leading up to her Calgary Stampede shows, Twain said she hoped to tour in 2015 and that it would lead to the release of a new album. Alongside her Calgary Stampede shows, Twain also headlined a show on Labour Day weekend at Charlottetown, Prince Edward Island, Canada.

On March 4, 2015, Twain announced on Good Morning America she would be going on tour for the first time in 11 years, and would begin June 5 in Seattle, Washington, and end on October 11 in Toronto, Ontario. Twain also announced this would be her last tour before her fifth studio album, which she intends to release while she is 50. In an interview on Global Television Network's The Morning Show on March 6, Twain confirmed that she is not retiring from her music career after the tour. In an interview with Radio.com published on March 5, she stated that she has found several producers for her upcoming album, describing it as "soul music".

On August 24, 2015, Twain stated: "First, I have to finish my new album this winter. Six tracks are already completed. I've written 38 songs in total, and now the process is underway to narrow that down to another six or eight to finish recording". That same month, it was announced by several sources, that even though her current Rock This Country Tour is her final time touring, she is possibly planning on extending the tour overseas because the Rock This Country tour was only based in the United States and Canada. Twain also mentioned, possibly returning to Las Vegas with a new residency show for possibly late 2016 or 2017. The new show would end up featuring music from her long-awaited new album as well as her hits.

2016–2021: Now, second Las Vegas residency
In October 2016, Twain confirmed to Rolling Stone that she had new music coming "really soon." In December 2016 in an interview with Billboard, she spoke about her forthcoming album, describing the finished product as "kind of schizophrenic musically" maintaining "She's the glue". In February 2017, Twain again spoke to Rolling Stone about the album; select song titles were confirmed, as Twain detailed that she had not only hoped to release a single in March, but that she planned to release the album in May. She performed at the 2017 Stagecoach Festival, held on April 29.

In April 2017, Billboard announced that Twain's new single, "Life's About to Get Good", would premiere in June, with the album projected for release in September. Twain headlined the 2017 Stagecoach Festival in Indio, California, where she previewed her new music for the first time. Twain performed on the Today Shows "Summer Concert Series" on June 16, 2017. Her fifth studio album, Now, was released on September 29, 2017 and would debut at No. 1 on the Billboard 200, becoming her second album to do so.

In June 2017, Twain announced on ET Canada that she would in fact tour with her new album Now. The Now Tour was announced by Twain on her official website on August 17, 2017.

The album's second single, "Swingin' With My Eyes Closed", was released on August 18, 2017. She has also internationally released two other promotional singles off of Now, including "Poor Me" and "We've Got Something They Don't".

In June 2019, Twain announced her second Las Vegas residency, Let's Go!, which opened on December 6, 2019, and was due to run for two years. The COVID-19 pandemic caused the postponement and cancellation of many dates.

2022–present: Not Just a Girl and Queen of Me
In July 2022, a Netflix documentary spanning Twain's career, Not Just A Girl, was released simultaneously with a companion compilation album, Not Just a Girl (The Highlights), featuring 17 previously released songs plus the new title track.

The Not Just A Girl documentary was shortlisted for the Rose d'Or 2022 Awards in the Art category.

On September 9, 2022, Twain announced "Waking Up Dreaming" as the first single from her sixth studio album, Queen of Me. The album was released in February 2023 and includes the single "Giddy Up!".

TV and film career
Twain's mainstream pop acceptance was further helped by her appearance in the 1998 first edition of the VH1 Divas concert where she sang alongside Mariah Carey, Celine Dion, Gloria Estefan, Carole King and Aretha Franklin, and also by VH1's 1999 heavily aired Behind the Music, which concentrated on the tragic aspects of her early life as well as her physical attractiveness and Nashville's early resistance to her bare-midriff music videos. After Divas, Twain sang background vocals with Lange for Dion's songs, "If Walls Could Talk" and "Goodbye's (The Saddest Word)".

Twain appeared as herself in the 2004 feature film I Heart Huckabees.

On November 12, 2008, Twain made her first television appearance since her split from Lange, where she appeared as a surprise presenter at the 42nd CMA Awards.

In 2009, Twain served as a guest judge on American Idol, for the show's August 30 and 31 episodes.

In April 2010, Twain announced plans for her own TV show, titled Why Not? with Shania Twain. The show debuted on May 8, 2011, on OWN. Twain returned to American Idol as a guest mentor for a week where the top 6 contestants showcased her songs. After the conclusion of the ninth season Twain was very close to becoming a judge but ultimately it was Jennifer Lopez who got the job.

Twain guest starred as herself on the Comedy Central series Broad City, in a September 2017 episode titled "Twaining Day".

On October 23, 2017, Twain appeared as a guest judge on the 25th season of Dancing with the Stars during the show's "Movie Night", and also performed her song "Soldier". Twain appeared as a guest judge on episode five of the 10th Season of Rupaul's Drag Race.

She competed against singer Meghan Trainor in an episode of TBS's Drop the Mic which aired in January 2018.

Twain was guest of honour for a Lip Sync Battle episode on Paramount Network pitting Derek Hough against Nicole Scherzinger that was dedicated to her and her music. The tribute episode aired June 21, 2018.

In November 2018, Twain appeared in the reality talent show Real Country, as an executive producer and co-presenter with Jake Owen and Travis Tritt.

In 2019, Twain appeared in the film Trading Paint, co-starring alongside John Travolta. In 2020, Twain played the role of the mother of singer Jeremy Camp in the biographical film I Still Believe.

In 2023, she will appear on the panel for the second series of ITV's Starstruck, a revived and reformatted version of Stars in Their Eyes.

Artistry
Twain possesses a contralto vocal range. In 1996, Newsweek defended Twain from detractors who attributed her refusal to tour at the time to her inability to replicate her studio singing live, describing it as "a warm, languid alto sweetened with a wisp of bedroom allure". Admitting that her singing voice is not as strong as it was prior to her Lyme disease diagnosis, Twain had to learn how to navigate her new voice in order to continue performing. Prior to her official diagnosis, several physicians with whom Twain consulted throughout the years primarily attribute the loss of her voice to emotional stress, from which she has since recovered after experimenting with various relaxation techniques and devoting a lot of time to vocal warmups. In 2018, Twain underwent laryngoplasty to have Gore-Tex stabilizers implanted in her throat to reduce the workload on her vocal muscles.

Twain did little writing on her self-titled debut album, but Lange noticed the singer "had a distinctive voice as a songwriter" he felt had been overlooked by other collaborators. Describing Twain and Lange as a "versatile" songwriting duo, Bob Paxman of Sounds Like Nashville observed that their songs explore several themes such as feminism and romantic longing, while Maclean's journalist Brian D. Johnson said her songs "range from domestic-bliss ballads to sassy rockers that taunt and tease." Alanna Nash of AARP observed that Twain crafted The Woman in Me around "hooky melodies and clever wordplay" from her point of view. During the 1990s, record executives feared Twain's lyrics were too "male-threatening"; both The Woman in Me and Come On Over contain feminist and anti-infidelity themes. Although she has become synonymous with singing songs about female empowerment that are "full of attitude", her catalogue also consists of love songs. Twain believes female singers are often misunderstood for expressing "feminist views" or standing up for themselves, about which she often sings, explaining, "that doesn't mean that we don't love the men in our lives, and that we don't need the men in our lives." Twain tends to isolate herself when writing songs to avoid distractions, believing she is most productive in this manner. She claims to adapt melancholy experiences into happy songs. Now was the first album Twain wrote without Lange's involvement, identifying the procedure as a very important songwriting experience because "I needed to do it alone, to start ideas and finish them without relying on anybody else's opinion and direction." Drawing from raw feelings of pain, she also used the album to process the demise of their relationship. Her primary musical genre is considered to be country pop, with AllMusic critic Stephen Thomas Erlewine declaring that she "Skillfully fus[ed] mainstream, AOR rock production with country-pop". Some country music critics dismissed Twain's music as not being country enough, which some fans theorize resulted in her breakthrough album The Woman in Me being snubbed at the 1995 Country Music Awards, despite its widespread success. Up is considered to be her most straightforward pop album to-date. Twain has expressed that she is not particularly fond of performing live.

Twain cites Karen Carpenter, Dolly Parton, Mickey Guyton, Taylor Swift, The Chicks, Wynonna Judd, and Kelsea Ballerini as some of the female country artists who inspire her. She has also expressed admiration for female country singers Loretta Lynn, Patsy Cline, Tammy Wynette, Reba McEntire and LeAnn Rimes.

Public image and reception 
Despite her success, Twain has been a divisive figure within country music among purists who initially did not take kindly to her "genre-blending". According to biographer Stephen Thomas Erlewine, most critics accused her of "diluting country with bland, anthemic hard rock techniques and shamelessly selling her records with sexy videos." Similar to Garth Brooks before her, Twain was initially branded an interloper whose modern production, presentation and songwriting "disrupt[ed] the genre's status quo". During the 1990s, Twain often received backlash for her unconventionally liberated appearance as a country music singer. Despite the breakthrough success of The Woman in Me, early detractors did not take her seriously as an artist, with several music journalists questioning her lyrics, the "manufactured" production of her albums, and her singing ability. Such critics concurred that Twain had little to offer apart from her sex appeal and music videos, often focusing on her physical appearance instead of her music. Early in her career, Twain found herself at-odds with the conservative opinions of the country music industry at the time due to her assertive personality and proclivity for wearing revealing outfits that exposed her midriff. Twain was constantly deprecated for baring her midriff to the point where critics nicknamed it "The most famous midriff in Nashville", while CMT banned the music video for her debut single "What Made You Say That". The Independent's Roisin O'Connor believes "Nashville hadn't seen anything like Twain [before] – a leopard print-loving, midriff-exposing artist determined to be an international star." According to Kristin M. Hall of the Associated Press, since the singer had not yet begun touring, Twain used music videos to broaden her audience. Similarly, Erlewine considers Twain to be "the first country artist to fully exploit MTV's style" by cultivating "a sexy, video-oriented image ... that appealed" to both country and pop audiences, largely without touring.

Twain's record label cautioned her that both men and women would dislike her independence and sexual expressiveness, respectively, but she did not believe them. Record executives warned her that women would feel threatened by her "dressing too sexy". Refusing "to conform to a single archetype of femininity", Twain recalled that she used music to communicate with like-minded women by alternating between heartbroken, comedic, vengeful, empowered, self-deprecating and lustful personas "all on the same record." Country rock musician Steve Earle famously labelled Twain "the world's highest-paid lap-dancer." Despite these criticisms, Twain's music has largely been embraced by fans. In a 2015 profile on the singer, Maclean's Sonya Bell theorized that Twain's early critics would be shocked by her continued success, while American Songwriter's Joe Vitagliano considers her a testament that "critics and the 'industry' aren't quite the 'be-all, end-all' that they think they are". Sarah Koo of Entertainment Tonight Canada wrote that, in hindsight, Twain's image throughout the 1990s seems tame in comparison to the revealing outfits of artists who have since succeeded her. Twain maintains that she did not dress proactively for fame, attention or "shock value" but simply because she enjoys her midriff, claiming to have no regrets about her past outfits. She defends contemporary pop stars who dress provocatively, explaining, "I don't think it's too sexy now ...The boundaries are really up to the individual. And then it's up to the viewer whether they like it or not."

At one point, Twain was considered to be among the biggest music stars in the world. Journalist Brian D. Johnson wrote that, despite her girl next door image, the singer "has the sort of star power that people expect from royalty", which he attributes to her Cinderella-esque life story. The Guardian's Simon Hattenstone described Twain as "sexy, empowering and funny. This was a woman who knew what she wanted – men, action, dancing, control." Calling her equally country, pop and rock star, Hattenstone went on to write that the singer is "fancied by the straight boys, admired by the straight girls, adored by gay men as a camp icon and loved by lesbians who read what they wanted into Man! I Feel Like a Woman!." Claiming Twain's stint hosting the 2003 Juno Awards was noticeably void of diva behaviour despite persistent rumours of outrageous antics and demands at the time, Brad Wheeler of The Globe and Mail described Twain as "an international icon and Canada's sweetheart", a sentiment with which Juno Awards producer John Brunton agreed. Instead the singer relied on her own security, band, production team and assistants.

Legacy 
Twain's success in the music industry has earned her the honorific nickname the "Queen of Country Pop". By 1998, Maclean's had named Twain "the reigning queen of country music". American Songwriter contributor Joe Vitagliano named Twain one of the greatest artists of our time. The New York Times music critic Jon Caramanica named Twain "Country's Crossover Queen", writing that during her prime Twain "was both a pop centrist and a country rebel, and many of the aesthetic moves she pioneered ended up, following a period of some resistance, as central to the sound of Nashville." In a ranking of the singer's best songs, Rolling Stone stated that Twain's catalogue of music "ha[s] come to define an era in country music and paved the way for other genre-bending artists that followed." According to Kristin M. Hall of the Associated Press, Twain's global success "changed country music for years to come." Nash credits Twain's work on Come On Over with helping to redefine the future of country music. NPR's Jewly Hight wrote that, despite initial derision, Twain eventually "redefin[ed] what country superstardom looked, sounded and behaved like", ultimately influencing a generation of country artists "in making flashier music videos, beefing up their backbeats and staging shows with the energy and theatricality of arena rock."

BBC Online described her as "the real Queen of Pop", citing her influence on subsequent successful female artists such as Meghan Trainor, Britney Spears, Taylor Swift and Haim. As one of country music's first crossover stars, the website claims Twain's success as a country-pop crossover artist demonstrates that "she was doing the Taylor Swift thing before Taylor Swift even arrived." Swift has cited Twain as one of her most prominent musical influences.  Country singer Carrie Underwood believes all similar artists were influenced by Twain, whether or not they realize it. Twain has also been cited as a major influence among Canadian country music artists such as Jess Moskaluke, Dean Brody, Lindi Ortega and Brett Kissel. Justin Chandler of CBC credited with making "country-pop crossover its own genre" and "paving the way for artists sitting atop those same charts every year since." Rapper Post Malone and singer Rihanna have cited Twain as an inspiration, with the former calling her his childhood crush. Twain covered Malone's song "Rockstar" live during the American Music Awards. Twain has expressed interest in collaborating with Malone, claiming to have written a song for the two of them in 2019. Singer-songwriter and actor Harry Styles has mentioned Twain as his biggest influence both "musically and in fashion".

Cultural impact 
Shania Twain is credited for being the first of many country artists to cross over into pop music. Taylor Swift credits Twain for her pop crossover. Her record-breaking album "The Woman In Me" is also credited as the one that permanently changed country music as a whole, while Carrie Underwood states that Twain "paved the way for a lot of us." CBC discussed in an article how Twain shaped Canadian country music by asking various Canadian artists about how she inspired them including Tenille Arts, Brett Kissel and Dean Brody.

Twain's bold fashion statements also inspired multiple artists. Harry Styles revealed in an interview with Entertainment Tonight that in "I think, both music and fashion," his "main influence was probably Shania Twain." Halsey also cited her as one of the artists she was inspired by in her music video "You Should Be Sad".

Endorsements
In January 2005, Twain joined Scentstories by Febreze to create a limited edition scent disc with the proceeds going to America's Second Harvest. In late 2005, Twain partnered with Coty to produce her namesake fragrance "Shania" by Stetson. A second fragrance was released in September 2007, called "Shania Starlight". On January 1, 2010, Twain carried the Olympic Torch through her hometown as part of the 2010 Winter Olympics torch relay.

Personal life
Twain met producer Robert John "Mutt" Lange after he heard her original songs and singing from her debut album; he then offered to produce and write songs with her. They first met at Nashville's Fan Fair in June 1993 and quickly became close. They were married on December 28, 1993, and had a son, Eja (pronounced "Asia"), on August 12, 2001. On May 15, 2008, it was announced that Twain and Lange were separating after Lange had an affair with Twain's best friend, Marie-Anne Thiébaud. Their divorce was finalized on June 9, 2010. On December 20, 2010, it was reported that Twain was engaged to Swiss Nestlé executive Frédéric Thiébaud, Marie-Anne's former husband. They were married on January 1, 2011, in Rincón, Puerto Rico.

Twain is a vegetarian and a devotee of Sant Mat, an Eastern spiritual philosophy. In 2010, Twain created Shania Kids Can, a charity designed to address the needs of neglected children who are frequently overlooked by social assistance programs. Twain's autobiography, From This Moment On, was published on March 27, 2011. She is a long-time resident of Corseaux, Switzerland, where her son was born. Twain is a hockey fan. When performing, Twain will sometimes wear the jersey of the local National Hockey League team.

Awards and honours

In addition to her various awards for her singles and albums, Twain has received a number of personal honours:
 She was named the 1999 Entertainer of the Year by both the Academy of Country Music and the Country Music Association; Twain was the first non-US citizen to win the CMA award.
 Twain was ranked No.7 in Country Music Television's 40 Greatest Women of Country Music in 2002.
 In 2003, Twain was inducted into Canada's Walk of Fame.
 The city of Timmins Ontario, renamed a street for her, gave her the key to the city, and built the Shania Twain Centre in her honour.
 On November 18, 2005, Twain was invested as an Officer in the Order of Canada.
 Twain was inducted into the Canadian Music Hall of Fame at the Juno Awards on March 27, 2011.
 On June 2, 2011, Twain received a star on the Hollywood Walk of Fame. Her star is the 2,442nd Star on the Hollywood Walk of Fame in the Category of Recording.
 In 2016, Twain was declared the "Artist of a Lifetime" by CMT and was given a special award during the 2016 Artists of the Year ceremony.
 In June 2017, Twain had her own exhibit at the Country Music Hall of Fame titled Shania Twain: Rock This Country. It ran through 2018.
 In 2018, Twain was announced as the second recipient of the CCMA Generation Award.
 In August 2022, Twain received the Poet's Award from the Academy of Country Music honouring her songwriting
 In October 2022, Twain was inducted into the Nashville Songwriters Hall of Fame.
 In December 2022, Twain received the Music Icon Award at the 48th People's Choice Awards.

Discography

 Shania Twain (1993)
 The Woman in Me (1995)
 Come On Over (1997)
 Up! (2002)
 Now (2017)
 Queen of Me (2023)

Filmography

Tours
Co-headlining tours
 Triple Play Tour (1993; with John Brannen and Toby Keith)

Headlining tours
 Come On Over Tour (1998–1999)
 Up! Tour (2003–2004)
 Rock This Country Tour (2015)
 Now Tour (2018)
 Queen of Me Tour (2023)

Residencies
 Shania: Still the One (2012–2014)
 Let's Go! (2019–2022)

See also
 Music of Canada
 Forbes list of highest-earning musicians

References

Footnotes

Sources
 .
 .
 .

External links

 
 
 [ Shania Twain] at Billboard.com
 

 
1965 births
Living people
20th-century Canadian women singers
21st-century Canadian women singers
21st-century Canadian actresses
Actresses from Windsor, Ontario
Canadian adoptees
Canadian women country singers
Canadian country singer-songwriters
Canadian women pop singers
Canadian contraltos
Canadian expatriates in New Zealand
Canadian expatriates in Switzerland
Canadian people of English descent
Canadian people of Irish descent
Country pop musicians
Mercury Records artists
Musicians from Windsor, Ontario
Officers of the Order of Canada
Musicians from Timmins
Canadian people of French descent
Contemporary Sant Mat
APRA Award winners
Grammy Award winners
Echo (music award) winners
World Music Awards winners
Juno Fan Choice Award winners
Juno Award for Artist of the Year winners
Juno International Achievement Award winners
Juno Award for Songwriter of the Year winners
Juno Award for Country Album of the Year winners
Canadian Country Music Association Fans' Choice Award winners
Canadian Country Music Association Female Artist of the Year winners
Canadian Country Music Association Song of the Year winners
Canadian Country Music Association Single of the Year winners
Canadian Country Music Association Top Selling Canadian Album winners
Canadian Music Hall of Fame inductees
Women autobiographers